Wolf-Rüdiger Netz (born 15 December 1950 in Schwerin) is a former football player from East Germany.

Netz began playing football at SG Dynamo Schwerin when he was eight years old and made his professional debut with SG Dynamo Schwerin in the DDR-Liga in the 1968-69 season. Netz joined BFC Dynamo during the summer of 1971. He became five times East German champion in a row with BFC Dynamo.

Netz won the silver medal with the East German Olympic team at the 1980 Summer Olympics in Moscow. Together with his teammates, he was awarded the Patriotic Order of Merit in bronze the same year.  The forward also won two caps for the East Germany national team.

Netz scored 112 goals in 265 league matches for the record champion BFC Dynamo. Nobody scored more goals for die Weinroten in the top division of East German football. Only Hans-Jürgen Riediger also managed to amass a three-digit number of goals for BFC Dynamo.

References

External links
 
 
 
 

People from Schwerin
Living people
German footballers
East German footballers
Footballers at the 1980 Summer Olympics
Olympic footballers of East Germany
Olympic silver medalists for East Germany
Berliner FC Dynamo players
Olympic medalists in football
Recipients of the Patriotic Order of Merit
Association football forwards
East Germany international footballers
Medalists at the 1980 Summer Olympics
1950 births